Maree Therese Luckins Davenport (born 14 March 1968) is an Australian politician. She was a Liberal member of the Victorian Legislative Council from 1996 to 2002, representing Waverley Province as Maree Therese Luckins.

Early life
Davenport joined the Noble Park Young Liberal Party in 1986, and was active in the Young Liberals.

Politics
Luckins (as she was then) was endorsed as the Liberal candidate for the seat of Dandenong North in 1991 and gained a swing of over 8 per cent, but was unsuccessful by 19 votes.  She was Ministerial Advisor to Minister for Industry and Employment and Deputy Leader of the Liberal party Phil Gude from 1992 until 1996 when she was elected to the Victorian Legislative Council for Waverley Province at the age of 28. She was the youngest woman elected in Victoria (with an 18-month-old son) and the first to give birth (eldest daughter), while serving as a Member of Parliament.

From 1996 to 2002, she chaired the Liberal Party health policy committee and was later appointed Shadow Parliamentary Secretary for Human Services with responsibility for Health, Housing, Community Services and Aged Care.  In addition, she was appointed to serve on the Consumer Affairs, Industry and Employment, Industrial Relations, Small Business, Multicultural Affairs and Women's Affairs Policy Committees and the Victorian Parliament's Joint all-party Scrutiny of Acts and Regulations Committee (SARC). She also served as Chair of the Redundant Legislation Committee and Deputy Chair of the Regulation Review Committee.

She held the seat until 2002, when she unsuccessfully attempted to transfer to the Legislative Assembly seat of Narre Warren North following a redistribution of Waverley Province.

Davenport was the endorsed Liberal candidate in the seat of Mulgrave in 2018, standing against Daniel Andrews, however, was unsuccessful, blaming ‘leadership turmoil in the Coalition Federal Government’.

Post-parliament
Davenport is company director of advocacy firm Regs and Corporate Advisory Pty Ltd, trading as Government and Corporate Advisory Network (was Phoenix Public Affairs) which she founded in 2004, specialising in peak bodies, consumer advocacy, NFP, housing, aged care, health, building and industry sectors. She is an Accredited NMAS Mediator  and is a Member of the Australian Institute of Company Directors, Governance Institute of Australia,  Mediation Institute,  Resolution Institute, Victorian Women's Trust, Women on Boards and the National Association of Women in Construction.

Maree is Chair and a Non-Executive Director of Endometriosis Australia</ref>https://www.endometriosisaustralia.org/</ref> and Tradeswomen Australia.</ref>https://tradeswomenaus.com/maree-davenport/
She is a Member of Chief Executive Women.

Davenport Chaired the Minister for Planning's Building Advisory Council (BAC) 2013 to 2019. She served as a Member of the Building Appeals Board at the Victorian Building Authority, 2010 to 2013.

Maree earned a Master of Leadership at Deakin University and Faculty of Business and Law Certification as a Professional Practice Expert in Adaptive Mindsets, Collaboration, Communication, Critical Thinking, Cultural Engagement, Digital Literacy, Driving Strategic Results, Empowering Others, Leading & Developing People and Problem Solving and is specialising in Gender Equality Action Plans and Implementation.</ref>https://www.advisorygovcorp.com.au/community-and-social-enterprise

Personal life
Davenport’s husband Marcus is a Partner and National Board Director at Clayton Utz Lawyers.

References

1968 births
Living people
Liberal Party of Australia members of the Parliament of Victoria
Members of the Victorian Legislative Council
21st-century Australian politicians
Women members of the Victorian Legislative Council
21st-century Australian women politicians